Porus is a historical drama television series based on the Battle of the Hydaspes, visualizing the lives of Indian warrior and ruler Porus, King of the Paurava Kingdom and Alexander the Great, King of Macedonia. It aired from 27 November 2017 till 13 November 2018 on Sony Entertainment Television. Another historical drama Chandragupta Maurya replaced it.

The show was created by Siddharth Kumar Tewary of Swastik Productions. It is the most expensive show on Indian television, having a budget of about INR 500 crores (roughly USD 63 million).

Plot

Story of Porus (Puru)
Two rival Indian kingdoms, the Pauravas (of the Puru tribe) and Takshashila (of the Bharat tribe) decide to end their enmity with a political marriage of the king of the Paurava Kingdom, Bamni and Anusuya, the younger sister of Ambhiraj, the king of Takshashila. Unlike her brother Ambhiraj, who cares only for his kingdom, Anusuya dreams of a united India. However, a Persian trader, Darius conspires with Ambhiraj and Bamni's elder brother and prime minister, Shiv Dutt, breaking the peace between the two kingdoms and forcing the pregnant Anusuya to flee. During her escape, she gives birth to a son, Porus (native name Purushottam, nicknamed Puru). Shiv Dutt tries to kill Anusuya and Porus by throwing them in River Jhelum. However, the Commander-in-Chief of the Paurava Kingdom, Ripudaman saves Porus and raises him in the Dasyu Kingdom, made up of pirates. Meanwhile, Darius (who later becomes the emperor of Persia) manipulates Bamni into becoming his trade partner with the intention of gradually stealing India's wealth, leaving a heavy Persian influence on the Paurava Kingdom. On Shiv Dutt's suggestion, Bamni marries Kadika, sister of Shiv Dutt's right-hand man and Paurava general. Samar Singh. and has a son, Kanishk. Years later, after a series of events resulting in Ripudaman's death, Porus is reunited with his parents and eventually drives Darius out of India. Shiv Dutt, who detests Takshashila and does not want the half-Takshashilan Porus to succeed Bamni, overthrows Bamni and installs Kanishk as king. However, Porus soon retakes the Paurava kingdom, resulting in Shiv Dutt's death and Kanishk's imprisonment. Considering Porus more worthy than himself, Bamni willingly renounces the throne and Porus becomes king of the Paurava Kingdom.

Story of Sikander (Alexander)
In Macedonia, Queen Olympias insults King Philip, resulting in the latter raping her. To avenge this insult, Olympias proclaims their son, Alexander, as the son of Zeus (King of the Greek Gods). Alexander grows up to be an ambitious, as well as respectful prince, and proves his skills in a battle. His half-brother Arrhideaus is made a mad person by Olympia. Philip marries Cleopatra Eurydice of Macedon, and denies Alexander the throne, saying that his and Cleopatra's son will be his successor. This leaves Alexander heartbroken and wants revenge. Cleopatra Eurydice gives birth to a daughter, and also Philip decides to wed his daughter Cleopatra of Macedon to Alexander I of Epirus. They wed, however Philip is soon assassinated by Pausanias on Alexander's command, making Alexander the new king. Olympias and Alexander also murder Cleopatra of Eurydice, her two infant children, Arrihdeaus' mother Philinna and Cleopatra's father Attalus. Arrhideaus is spared by Alexander due to his insanity. Alexander soon becomes a ruthless ruler, conquering many kingdoms, including Persia, resulting in the death of Darius.

Porus' and Sikandar's meeting and aftermath
Alexander arrives in India, vassalising Ambhiraj and thus capturing Takshashila. Kanishk escapes imprisonment and allies with Alexander, though he later redefects to the Pauravas and is killed by Alexander. Alexander attacks the Pauravas resulting in a war lasting months. Both sides have heavy losses during the war, with Porus losing his parents though he kills Ambhiraj. Eventually, Alexander is victorious in the Battle of the Hydaspes in 326 BCE and captures Porus, but impressed by Porus's bravery, he returns his kingdom to him. Afraid of the army of the Nanda Emperor Dhana Nanda, which is far bigger than Porus', Alexander's army refuses to advance further, forcing him to retreat. Porus has a son, Malayketu. On his way to Macedonia, Alexander dies under mysterious circumstances in Babylon in 323 BCE. The same year, Porus and Laachi are assassinated in a group attack by Ambhiraj's vengeful son Ambhikumar and Alexander's former general Seleucus, though Malayketu survives. In his final moments, Porus entrusts the future of India to his prime minister and advisor, the Brahmin scholar Chanakya.

Cast

Main
 Laksh Lalwani as Porus (native name Purushottam, nicknamed Puru): First son of the Paurava king, Bamni with the Takshashilan princess, Anusuya. Elder half-brother of Kanishk. Husband of Laachi and father of Malayketu. Adoptive son of Ripudaman and Pritha, and adoptive younger brother of Hasti. Is thrown in River Jhelum by his paternal uncle, Shiv Dutt due to his half-Takshashilan ancestry but is saved by the Paurava Commander-in-Chief, Ripudaman who raises him among the Dasyus (a group of pirates). Years later, he reunites with his parents and becomes the crown prince and eventually, king of the Pauravas. He is the destined rival of the Macedonian emperor Alexander the Great and fights a long war with him which concludes at the Battle of the Hydaspes (326 BCE) at the end of which Porus is defeated and captured. However, impressed by his bravery, Alexander returns him his kingdom. In 323 BCE, Porus is assassinated by his cousin, the Takshashilan crown prince Ambhikumar (whose father he had killed in the war with Alexander) and Alexander's ambitious general Seleucus. Loosely based on Porus.
 Rohit Purohit as Alexander (titled 'the Great' and 'Sikandar (lit. defender)): Son of the Macedonian king, Philip and his Greek wife, Olympias. Husband of Roxane and Barsine, and posthumously father of Alexander IV. Prince, later Commander-in-Chief, and later King of Macedonia. From childhood, he is told by his mother that he is the son of Zeus (King of the Greek Gods) and that he must stretch his empire as far as India. He is also made immune to poison by his mother. Is initially very loyal to his father Philip, but after Philip denies him the throne, he along with Olympias, has him assassinated. He is a military genius who conquers the vast Persian Empire and Bactria before finally reaching India. Here, he faces his toughest enemy, Porus and fights a long war with him. Though he is eventually victorious in the Battle of the Hydaspes, impressed with Porus' bravery, he returns his kingdom to him. While returning to Macedonia, he dies under mysterious circumstances at Babylon in 323 BCE. Loosely based on Alexander the Great.
 Vidhvaan Sharma as Alexander in infancy.
 Rati Pandey as Anusuya: Princess of Takshashila, later Queen and later Queen Mother of the Pauravas. Younger sister of Ambhiraj, first wife of Bamni and mother of Porus. The Paurava king Bamni married her as a plot to insult her and Takshashila, but later genuine love develops between Anusuya and Bamni. However this marriage and her dream of creating a united India earns her the ire of Ambhiraj (who detests the Pauravas) and Bamni's brother Shiv Dutt (who detests the Takshashilans). The conspiracies of these two along with the foreign trader Darius  results in Anusuya being thrown in River Jhelum by Shiv Dutt but survives. However, this attack renders her mentally unstable. Years later, she reunites with Bamni and Porus and regains her memory. She is always a strong support for Porus. Following Bamni's overthrowal by Shiv Dutt, she is imprisoned and maltreated. She makes a vow to kill Shiv Dutt and fulfills it after Porus regains control of the Paurava kingdom. At Porus' wedding, she kills his brother-in-law Sumer as he was trying to kill Porus. However, she is unable to prove Sumer was guilty which causes a temporary rift between the Pauravas and the Dasyus. During the war of Porus and Alexander, she is treacherously killed by Ambhiraj (who accepted Alexander's suzerainty). Her death is soon avenged when Porus kills Ambhiraj.
 Aditya Redij as Bamni: Father of Porus and Kanishk, husband of Anusuya and Kadika, and younger brother of Shiv Dutt. King, later King Emeritus of the Pauravas. He initially cared only for his family and kingdom, and is thus manipulated by his elder brother Shiv Dutt and later, the Persian trader Darius. However, after he reunites with Porus and learns about the truth of his brother and Darius, he firmly supports his son. He is overthrown and grievously wounded by Shiv Dutt who did not want Porus to succeed him. However, Porus with the help of Chanakya saves him. Later, he regains his kingdom but willingly abdicates the throne in favour of Porus, as he thinks Porus is more worthy to rule than him. Thenceforth, he becomes Porus' right-hand man and is a major help to him in the war against Alexander. He is grievously wounded by Seleucus and dies in a suicide attack in the Battle of the Hydaspes, killing several Macedonian soldiers.
 Sameksha as Olympias: Philip's fourth wife, Alexander and Cleopatra's mother. A devotee of Zeus, Princess of Epirus, Queen and later Queen Mother of Macedonia. She was forced to marry the Macedonian king, Philip (whom she considers inferior to Greeks) and after insulting him, was raped by him. To avenge this insult, she declares their son, Alexander as the son of Zeus. From his childhood, she motivates Alexander to stretch his empires as far as India. To clear all obstacles between Alexander and the throne, she uses black magic to render Alexander's half-brother Arrihdaeus insane and later conspires with Alexander to assassinate Philip and execute Philip's other wives and children (except Arrihdaeus). She immensely loves his son and tries to stop him from going to India after an Oracle tells her that Alexander will never return from India. However, Alexander refuses to listen to her. Later she joins Alexander in Persia and accompanies him till India. Here, she is captured by Porus. She tries to kill Porus through black magic but fails due to Chanakya's efforts. Soon, Porus returns her to Alexander. It is on her instigation that Alexander eventually chooses to make peace with Porus. She returns to Macedonia to welcome Alexander. She is not mentioned afterwards, so it can be presumed that she was killed by Alexander's general, Cassander in 316 BCE as in real history. Based on Olympias.
 Sunny Ghanshani as Philip: Alexander's, Arrihdaeus', Cleopatra's, Europa's and Caranus' father, Olympias', Philinna's and Cleopatra's (not to be confused with his daughter Cleopatra) husband. King of Macedonia. He is a capable, but arrogant ruler who initially makes Alexander the Commander-in-Chief of the Macedonian army but following his successes, starts getting jealous of him and denies him the throne. This resulted in a fight between the two and Philip ordered the execution of Alexander and Olympias, though both escaped. Later, he was forced to recall Alexander as he was going to attack Persia and needed a regent at Macedonia. He was assassinated by his bodyguard Pausanias (whom he disgraced) as part of a plot of Alexander and Olympias. Based on Philip II of Macedon.
 Suhani Dhanki as Laachi: Princess of the Dasyu Kingdom, later Queen of the Paurava Kingdom. Mahanandini and Arunayak's daughter, Sumer's younger sister. Porus' love interest and later wife and Malayketu's mother. She is Porus' best friend and biggest support in all his adventures and their friendship eventually culminates in love. She marries Porus shortly after his ascension to the throne. Has tensions with Porus after Sumer is killed by Anusuya but later reconciles with Porus after learning that Sumer was a traitor. Helps Porus during the war with Alexander, though she has to back out from the battlefield after her pregnancy. Despite losing her parents in the war, she forgives Alexander after he and Porus reconcile. Is assassinated by Seleucus and his men in 323 BCE as she tried in vain to protect Porus.

Recurring

 Mohit Abrol as Hasti: Ripudaman and Pritha's only son, elder adoptive brother of Porus. Commander-in-Chief of the Paurava Army, later King of Sindh. Is jealous of Porus because despite being younger, Porus is much more talented than him and thus is appreciated more by Ripudaman. Since everybody thinks Ripudaman was killed by Porus' paternal uncle Shiv Dutt, Hasti blames Porus for his father's death. Later sides with the Persians and unsuccessfully attempts to kill Porus' half-brother Kanishk. However, after Porus saves Hasti from execution and makes Darius confess that his men killed Ripudaman, he becomes a staunch supporter of Porus. After Porus becomes King of the Pauravas, Hasti soon becomes King of Sindh (a region Porus conquered). He is a major help to Porus in the war against Alexander. He is killed shortly before the Battle of the Hydaspes by Alexander and his men.
 Praneet Bhat as Darius: The last King of Kings of the Persian Empire, Barsine and Drypteis' father, Stateira's husband. He was an ambitious Persian trader who was attracted to India's immense wealth. He dreamt of establishing his control over India and taking all its wealth to Persia by exploiting the differences of the various Indian kingdoms. This brought him into conflict with the Takshashilan Princess (later Paurava Queen) Anusuya, who realised his true intentions and attempted to stop him. However, Darius conspired with Anusuya's brother Ambhiraj and brother-in-law Shiv Dutt resulting in Shiv Dutt attempting to kill Anusuya and her son Porus. However, both survived and Porus eventually succeeded in uniting the Pauravas, Takshashilans and Dasyus against Darius, thus driving him out of India. As soon as Darius returned to Persia, Alexander attacked Persia, defeating the Persians in every battle. Darius fled to Bactria, allying with King Bessus but fearing that Alexander may attack Bactria to capture Darius, Bessus had him beheaded and sent his head to Alexander. Loosely based on Darius III.
 Aman Dhaliwal as Shiv Dutt: Bamni's elder brother and Porus and Kanishk's paternal uncle. Prince and Prime Minister of the Paurava Kingdom under Bamni and Kanishk. He deeply loved his brother Bamni and despite being elder to him, relinquished his right to the throne in Bamni's favour as he considered Bamni more worthy to rule. He is extremely hot-headed and impulsive. He is also a debauchee, drinking profusely and abusing prostitutes. His defining trait is his deep-rooted hatred for the old enemy of the Pauravas, Takshashila and anything associated with it. Thus, he refuses to accept Anusuya and Porus as part of the Pauravas. When Anusuya is forced to insult Bamni by shaving his head, Shiv Dutt is furious, refuses to listen to Anusuya's justification (though the Paurava Commander-in-Chief Ripudaman backs her) and throws Anusuya and Porus in River Jhelum. He is very close to Bamni's second son Kanishk (whose mother is a Paurava) and treats him like his own son. When his truth is revealed to Bamni, he is imprisoned but later freed by Anusuya and reinstated in his former position after he helps Porus drive the Persians out of India. However, his imprisonment embittered him even more and turned him against Bamni whom he overthrows in a coup d'etat, installing Kanishk on the throne, resulting in Anusuya vowing to kill him. However Porus eventually regains control of the Paurava kingdom and he is killed by Anusuya (whom he tortured and humiliated during Kanishk's rule) and thus her vow is fulfilled.
 Savi Thakur as Kanishk: Second son of Bamni with Kadika, younger half-brother of Porus. Crown Prince, later Prince, and later King of the Pauravas. His character is arrogant and short-tempered just like his paternal uncle Shiv Dutt. He is also heavily influenced by his father's trade partner Darius and prefers Persian culture over Indian culture. He spent his entire life thinking he was Bamni's only son and successor. Thus, Porus returning and later becoming Crown Prince infuriates Kanishk and he along with Shiv Dutt overthrows Bamni and becomes king. However, he is soon dethroned and imprisoned by Porus, who ascends the throne. Later escapes and collaborates with Alexander and Sumer to assassinate Porus but fails and is imprisoned by Alexander for his failure. In prison, he finally realises his mistakes and attempts to return to the Paurava Kingdom to be judged by his family for his crimes, but is caught and killed by Alexander.
 Riya Deepsi as Barsine: Daughter of Darius and Stateira, elder sister of Drypteis, Kanishk's fiancée and Alexander's second wife. Initially she considers Indians inferior to Persians but impressed with Porus' bravery and resolve, eventually comes to respect them. She is a major help to Porus in driving Darius out of India. She later calls Porus to Persia to help them defend it from Alexander, but by the time Porus reaches Persia, she had already been captured by Alexander. Later, she escapes and with Porus' help is successful in uniting the remnants of the Persian army against Alexander. However, she is forced to back down after Alexander captures her mother and sister. Alexander then forcefully marries her to ally the Persian army with him. She is responsible for creating a feud between Alexander and his trusted general Cleitus, resulting in the latter's death. Then, she tries to assassinate Alexander but is stopped by Hephaestion. As punishment, she is raped by Alexander. Though Olympias also wanted to severely punish her, being a rape victim herself, she chastises Alexander for this brutality. She is not mentioned afterwards, so it can be assumed she was killed by Roxane after Alexander's death in 323 BCE, as in real history. Based on Stateira II, second wife of Alexander the Great.
 Gurpreet Singh as Ambhiraj: Anusuya's older brother and Porus' maternal uncle, Ambhikumar's father and Alka's husband. King of Takshashila. Like Shiv Dutt, he cares only for his kingdom and is highly hostile towards Takshashila's age-old enemy, the Pauravas. He does not accept Anusuya and Bamni's marriage and conspires against the Pauravas with the Persian trader Darius. He forced Anusuya to insult Bamni by shaving this head threatening to kill the Paurava royal family if she refused. However, he goes back on his words and launches a surprise attack on the Pauravas, though Anusuya forces him to stop by holding him hostage. Years later, he attempts to take over the Paurava Kingdom along with the now Emperor of Persia, Darius. However, Porus manages to convince him that Darius is just using him and will take over Takshashila soon as well so Takshashila temporarily allies with the Pauravas and helps drive the Persians out of India. Following Alexander's arrival in India, Ambhiraj accepts his suzerainty and is a major help to Alexander in the war against Porus. He attacks the Paurava Kingdom again and attempts to convince Anusuya (whom he still has a soft spot for) to surrender but upon her refusal, he kills her. Later at the insistence of his son he invites Porus' to negotiate with him but plays foul and attempts to kill him. However, Porus' was already prepared for any treachery and kills Ambhiraj, thus avenging Anusuya. Before his death he managed to manipulate Ambhikumar and Alka by lying that he did not kill Anusuya and the Pauravas broke down the negotiations. Loosely based on Taxiles, a ruler of Takshashila who supported Alexander against Porus.
 Zohaib Siddiqui as Ambhikumar: Ambhiraj's and Alka's son, Crown Prince of Takshashila. He is sent by his father to assassinate Porus but later comes to respect Porus' dream of a united India and becomes his close friend, helping him drive the Persians out of India. In the meantime, he also falls in love with Laachi, though she does not reciprocate it. He accompanies Porus to Persia to learn about Alexander's army and later helps him rescue Bamni from the clutches of Shiv Dutt and Kanishk. Though Ambhiraj allied with Alexander, Ambhikumar does what he can to help Porus in the war against Alexander. On his request, negotiations were held between Porus and Ambhiraj but Porus killed Ambhiraj to avenge his mother, Anusuya. Before his death, Ambhiraj manipulated Ambhikumar into thinking that he did not kill Anusuya and Porus was the one to sabotage the negotiations. These lies and his bereaved mother's instigations turn him against Porus. He vows he will not become King of Takshashila till he assassinates Porus. Though he outwardly remains an ally of Porus, he hatches several plots against the Paurava Kingdom behind his back. Later he learns his father's truth from his mother but by this point he has already done a lot against the Paurava Kingdom so he fears reprisal from Porus and decides there is no turning back. While Porus is at Magadha, he kidnaps Laachi, intending to forcefully have her. When Alka tries to stop him, he kills her. Laachi is soon rescued by Porus. Shortly before the Battle of Hydaspes, he is wounded while fighting with Bamni, so he does not participate in the battle. After the truce between Porus and Alexander, Porus later occupies Takshashila, further infuriating Ambhikumar. In 323 BCE, he assassinates Porus along with Alexander's former general, Seleucus. He returns in the sequel, Chandragupta Maurya as the King of Takshashila, where he is portrayed by Ankur Nayyar. Loosely based on Taxiles, a ruler of Takshashila who supported Alexander against Porus.
 Hrishikesh Pandey as Ripudaman: Porus' adoptive father, Hasti's father and Pritha's husband. Commander-in-Chief of the Paurava Kingdom and later the Dasyu Kingdom. Since he learned that Anusuya was forced by her brother to insult Bamni, he is the sole person in the Paurava Kingdom to support her. However, Shiv Dutt does not listen to him as well and tries to kill him along with Anusuya and Porus. However, he manages to save Porus and take shelter in the Dasyu Kingdom. He is very close to Porus and is treated by him like a father, even after Porus learns about his real parents. Years later, he returns to the Paurava Kingdom and rescues Anusuya from Shiv Dutt and Darius (who learnt that she survived) but in the ensuing conflict, he is killed by Darius. However, everybody thinks that he was killed by Shiv Dutt (as he had been fighting him earlier) until Porus forces Darius to confess.
 Shraddha Musale  as Mahanandini: Laachi and Sumer's mother, Arunayak's wife. Queen Regnant of the Dasyu Kingdom. After Ripudaman saves her life, she allows him and his family (including his adopted son Porus) to stay in the Dasyu Kingdom. She frequently comes at odds with Porus, and her daughter Laachi (who always supports Porus) for she cares solely for the welfare of the Dasyu Kingdom rather than being empathetic towards everyone. After the Persians (disguised as Pauravas) burn the Dasyu Kingdom, she attempts to attack the Paurava Kingdom. After Porus shows her the truth, she allies with the Pauravas and helps drive the Persians out of India. At Laachi and Porus' wedding, her Sumer attempts to kill Porus but is stopped and killed by Anusuya. She refuses to believe Sumer was a traitor and the Dasyus break off their alliance with the Pauravas. Later, she is forced to ally with Alexander and help him build a bridge across River Jhelum so Alexander can reach the Paurava Kingdom. Eventually she realises that supporting Alexander is equivalent to going against her nation and attempts to rebel against Alexander. However, she is killed by Hephaestion and her corpse is denied funeral rights until the Dasyus complete the bridge. Later, Porus rescues the Dasyus but her corpse is burnt on Cleitus' orders.
 Rishi Verma as Sumer: Laachi's elder brother, Mahanandini's son and Crown Prince of the Dasyu Kingdom. He is a close companion of Porus, though he is very jealous of him because Puru continuously outshines him and earns respect in the eyes of his parents and sister. He helps Porus take the Paurava slaves back to the Paurava Kingdom but after it becomes clear they cannot stay there, he is tasked with sending them to Magadha. However, his greed causes him to return to the Paurava Kingdom to retrieve the gem Porus stole from Farus. He is soon captured by Kanishk and brutally interrogated by Shiv Dutt and Kanishk for the whereabouts of Porus and the Dasyu Kingdom. Though he does not say anything about the Dasyu Kingdom, he sends a message to Porus, causing Porus to return to the Paurava Kingdom. Porus reluctantly gives Anusuya (he does not know yet that Anusuya is his mother) to Shiv Dutt in exchange for Sumer. Sumer helps Porus drive the Persians out of India and initially aides him in the war against Alexander. However, his jealousy for Porus and Alexander's offer of a sumptuous reward makes him side with Alexander. He and Kanishk try to assassinate Porus on his wedding day but he is stopped and killed by Anusuya. Though Porus, Bamni and Hasti later learn about his truth from Kanishk (and Laachi believes them), his parents refuse to believe he was a traitor and temporarily break off their alliance from the Pauravas.
 Chirag Jani (actor) as Arunayak: Laachi and Sumer's father, Porus' father-in-law, Mahanandini's husband. King Consort, later after his wife's death, King of the Dasyu Kingdom. Though not the ruler of the Dasyu Kingdom, he is highly respected by his wife. Despite being crippled, he is still a strong warrior. After the Dasyus re-ally with the Pauravas, he is a major support to Porus' in the war against Alexander. When Ambhikumar attempts to kidnap Laachi, he tries rescuing her but is killed by Alexander.
 Chetan Pandit/Tarun Khanna as Chanakya: A Brahmin scholar and advisor from Takshashila, later Prime Minister of the Pauravas who heals Bamni and helps Porus retake the Paurava Kingdom, thus going against his ruler Ambhiraj (who wanted to hand over Porus' to Alexander). He has some differences in Porus' as he believes ends are justified by means while Porus wants to succeed solely based on his principles, though they later reconcile. He is captured by Alexander but manages to escape. Later he captures Olympias and brings her to the Paurava Kingdom. He stops Olympias from killing Porus using black magic, thus causing Olympias to experience her own black magic. On Porus' order, he reluctantly saves Olympias. He along with his disciples is a major help to Porus in the war against Alexander. After Porus is treacherously attacked by Seleucus and Ambhikumar, in his final moments he passes his dream of a united India to Chanakya and urges him to go to enlist the help of Magadha (the most powerful Indian kingdom) to fulfill this goal. He returns in the sequel, Chandragupta Maurya. Loosely based on Chanakya.
 Saurabh Raj Jain as Dhana Nanda: Emperor of Magadha, the most powerful kingdom of India. He belongs to the Shudra (low-caste) Nanda Dynasty, who are by profession barbers. This causes him to have tense relations with the Kshatriyas (a higher caste), which included the Pauravas. He was first mentioned when he refused to join the alliance of the Pauravas, Takshashilans and Dasyus against Alexander. Later, when Alexander invades India, Porus sent his father, Bamni to request Dhana Nanda's help against Alexander. However, Dhana Nanda insulted Bamni by saying Kshatriyas only remember him when they need his help and captured him. Porus later freed Bamni after paying Dhana Nanda a heavy sum. Impressed by Porus' bravery, he allies with him against Alexander. However, Alexander makes him jealous of Porus by warning him that even if Porus defeats him with Dhana Nanda's help, history will call this Porus' victory and Porus' reputation will eclipse Dhana Nanda's. This causes him to break off the alliance with Porus. He returns in the sequel Chandragupta Maurya. Loosely based on Dhana Nanda, the last ruler of the Nanda Dynasty.
 Aparna Dixit as Roxane (native name Rukhsana): Alexander's first wife, Oxyartes' daughter, Alexander IV's mother. Princess of Bactria, later Queen of Macedonia. She is a highly brave and intelligent lady who is loyal to her kingdom, Bactria. Initially she despised Alexander for killing Bessus, the King of Bactria whom she highly admired and his overall ruthless nature. However, she eventually came to respect Alexander's bravery and determination to conquer the world. She attempted to stop the war between Porus and Alexander and when the attempt failed, unsuccessfully tried to kill Porus. She is glad when Alexander finally makes a truce with Porus and accompanies him to Babylonia. However, Alexander passes away, leaving her pregnant with their son. She is not shown or mentioned afterwards, so it can be presumed that she was killed by Alexander's general, Cassander in 310 BCE as in real history. Based on Roxana, first wife of Alexander the Great.
 Akash Singh Rajput / Akhil Kataria: Alexander's childhood friend and closest confidante. He is extremely loyal to him and always by his side. When Philip ordered the execution of Alexander and Olympias, he helped them escape to Epirus. After Philip's assassination, he becomes Alexander's second-in-command and general and accompanies him in all of his campaigns. He saves Alexander from getting killed by Barsine. After he forcibly restrains Alexander during a battle for his safety, he is disgraced by Alexander and replaced by Seleucus. Shortly before the Battle of the Hydaspes, he is greviously wounded while fighting Porus, though he later recovers. His death is not shown, so it can be presumed he died due to typhoid in 324 BCE, as in real history. Based on Hephaestion.
 Vikas Verma as Seleucus Nicator: One of Alexander's generals, who was appointed Governor of Persia by him. After Hephaestion is disgraced, he is summoned to India by Alexander and fights in the war against Porus, greviously wounding Hasti and later Bamni (in the Battle of the Hydaspes). In this war, his face is permanently scarred by Porus. He was infuriated by Alexander and Porus' truce. In 323 BCE, he returns to India and assassinates Porus and Laachi with Ambhikumar. He returns in the sequel, Chandragupta Maurya.
 Akshara Singh/Sangeeta Khanayat as Kadika: Queen of the Paurava Kingdom. Second wife of Bamni, mother of Kanishk and sister of Samar Singh. Following Anusuya's disappearance, she is married to Bamni by Shiv Dutt as Samar Singh was Shiv Dutt's right-hand man. She is not pleased with Porus and Anusuya's return which limits her powers and denies Kanishk the throne. However, she does not support her son in overthrowing Bamni but due to Shiv Dutt's strong influence on Kanishk, he does not listen to her. After Kanishk's overthrowal, Bamni spares his life on her intercession but Kanishk seeks revenge which leads to his death shortly thereafter.
 Ashlesha Sawant as Pritha: Porus' adoptive mother, Ripudaman's wife and Hasti's mother. Later Queen Mother of Sindh after Hasti is appointed King of Sindh by Porus. Unlike Ripudaman, who thinks of the future of his nation, she is solely concerned with her son's future and it thus reluctant to go to the Dasyu Kingdom with Ripudaman, where Hasti would be raised as a Dasyu. She always prefers Hasti over Porus and blames Porus for all the hardships she and her family suffered. She blames Porus for Ripudaman's death as everybody thinks it was Porus' paternal uncle Shiv Dutt and not Darius who killed him. However, she later learns the truth and her attitude towards Porus improves.
 Vasundhara Kaul as Alka: Wife of Ambhiraj, mother of Ambhikumar. Queen of Takshashila. Unlike her husband, she has a gentle nature and does not like Ambhiraj's animosity towards the Pauravas. Before his death during negotiations between the Pauravas and Takshashila, Ambhiraj managed to convince her and Ambhikumar that he did not kill Anusuya and the Pauravas broke down the negotiations. She then instigated her son against the Pauravas. She is tasked by Ambhikumar to kill the pregnant Laachi's child but cannot bring herself to do such a crime. After talking with Laachi, she finds out the truth about her husband. She then tried to convince Ambhikumar to not follow his father's path of hatred but Ambhikumar refuses to listen to her. After Ambhikumar kidnaps Laachi, she tried to stop him by force and is killed by him in the ensuing fight.
 Nitin Joshi / Amir Malik as Cleitus: A general of Philip, who was sympathetic towards Alexander when he was denied the throne by Philip and joined his side. He helped Alexander recruit Pausanias by deceiving him, and later killed Pausanias after he assassinated Philip on Alexander's orders. After Alexander became king, Cleitus became one of his foremost generals. At the Battle of Granicus, he saved Alexander's life. He accompanied Alexander till India and was one of his major generals in the war against Porus, where he saved Alexander's life again. However, he did not agree with Alexander attempting to starve the Pauravas and wanted a direct assault on them. Alexander's vengeful wife, Barsine, took advantage of these differences to incite Cleitus against Alexander. Eventually, a drunken altercation took place between the two resulting in Alexander killing Cleitus. After coming to his senses, Alexander direly regrets Cleitus' death. Loosely based on Cleitus the Black.
 Chandan Dilawar as Mazaeus (called Muashiz): Darius' bodyguard and aide. After Darius became King of Kings of Persia, he became his right-hand man and the satrap (governor) of Cilicia and later Babylon. He is highly loyal to Darius and aides him in all of his plans. After Darius' is badly defeated, Mazaeus accompanies him to Bactria. When Darius is disrespected by Roxane at Bactria, Mazaeus is infuriated and attempts to kill her. However, he fails and is killed by Roxane. Loosely based on Mazaeus, a Persian noble and general.
 Vishal Patni as Farus: Mazaeus' son, Darius' general and the Persian representative in India. He was leading a ship filled with Paurava slaves and a precious gemstone to Persia when his ship was looted by the Dasyus (led by Porus). Later, when Porus comes to the Paurava kingdom to take the slaves back to their home and is eventually reunited with his parents, he faces Farus several times. Like his father, Farus is highly loyal to Darius and aides him in his plans. He is killed by Alexander during the Battle of Issus in 333 BCE.
 Amaad Mintoo as Arrihdaeus: Son of Philip and Philinna, half-brother of Alexander. He is highly ambitious and covets the throne, which results in him clashing with Alexander. Prince of Macedonia. After Alexander outshines him in the Battle of Chaeronea by saving Philip's life, he fears that Philip would appoint Alexander as his successor so he unsuccessfully tries to assassinate him. This results in a vengeful Olympias using black magic to render Arrihdaeus insane, thus eliminating any possibility of him succeeding Philip. After Alexander ascends the throne, he spares Arrihdaeus due to his insanity. He is not shown afterwards, so it can be presumed he became the King of Macedonia following Alexander's death (as Alexander had no alive heir) and was killed by Olympias in 317 BCE, as in real history. Based on Philip III of Macedon (born Arrihdaeus).
 Sarehfar as Philinna: One of Philip's many wives, mother of Arrihdaeus. She deeply loves her son and wishes to see him on the throne. She is left heartbroken when her son becomes insane. After Alexander assassinates Philip and becomes King of Macedonia, she is executed by Olympias. Based on Philinna of Larissa, one of Philip II's wives.
 Pranav Sahay as Samar Singh: Kadika's brother, General of the Paurava Army and right-hand man of Shiv Dutt. He seeks to become the Commander-in-Chief of the Paurava Army and is very loyal to Shiv Dutt. He is sent by Shiv Dutt to capture Ripudaman but fails and is killed by Ripudaman in the ensuing battle.
 Raviz Thakur as Pausanias: A trusted bodyguard of Philip, who was sympathetic to Alexander after he was denied the throne. When Alexander returns to Macedonia, he creates a rift between Pausanias and Philip with the help of Cleitus, resulting in Philip publicly humiliating Pausanias. Upon Olympias' and Alexander's instigation, he assassinates Philip during the wedding of Alexander's sister Cleopatra. However, while escaping he is killed by Cleitus as Alexander did not want him to survive, in case he ever revealed the truth of Philip's death. Based on Pausanias of Orestis.
 Nimai Bali as Amatya Rakshasa: The Prime Minister of Magadh. Dhana Nanda's right-hand man and most trusted confidante. Is a Brahmin scholar, who has a rivalry with his fellow Brahmin Chanakya. Based on Rakshasa (amatya), a character of the play Mudrarakshasa. He returns in the sequel, Chandragupta Maurya.
 Aruna Irani as an Oracle: A Greek priestess and fortune teller. She predicts that Alexander will become a great ruler but as compensation for this, his lifespan will be short. She also predicts the death of Philip. She warns Olympias that if Alexander goes to India (where his destined rival is), he will never return. After Olympias tells this to Alexander and begs him not to go to India, Alexander feels insulted and kills the Oracle.
 Riyanka Chanda as Stateira: Darius' wife, Barsine and Drypteis' mother. She deeply loves her daughter and is concerned about their honour. Following Darius' defeat in the Battle of Issus, she attempts to honour suicide with her daughters but they are stopped and captured by Alexander. As Alexander's captives, she and her family accompany him till India. She and Drypteis are later freed by Barsine when she unites the Persian army against Alexander but both of them are eventually recaptured, forcing Barsine to surrender and marry Alexander. She is not mentioned afterwards. Loosely based on Stateira I.
 Shalini Sharma as Drypetis: Darius' younger daughter. Following the Battle of Issus, she along with her mother and sister are captured by Alexander. As Alexander's captive, she and her family accompany him to India. She and her mother are later freed by Barsine when she unites the Persian army against Alexander but both of them are eventually recaptured, forcing Barsine to surrender and marry Alexander. She is not mentioned afterwards, so it can be assumed she was killed by Roxane after Alexander's death in 323 BCE, as in real history. Based on Drypetis.
 Pooja Sharma as River Jhelum (called Mother Jhelum): The narrator of the story.
 Nalini Negi as Vishuddhi: A Visha Kanya (poison girl) sent by Shiv Dutt to assassinate Porus on his journey to Persia. However, impressed by Porus' bravery and kindness, she eventually joins him and helps him in learning about Alexander's army in Persia. When Porus has to escape from Persia, she attempts to stall Alexander and stabs him with a poisonous dagger. However, this has no effect on Alexander (who is immune to poison) and she is killed by Alexander.
 Jaival Pathak as Malay: A boy whose village was massacred by Vishuddhi. Vishuddhi forced him to act as her younger brother. He becomes extremely close to Porus and treats him like his older brother. After Vishuddhi joins Porus, Malay is sent to the Paurava Kingdom, as he is too young to accompany Porus on his expedition to Persia. There, he is captured by Shiv Dutt (who had spread fake news that Porus and his accomplices had been killed during the journey and did not want Malay to reveal the truth). However, Malay is rescued by Anusuya and reveals the truth to Bamni. Bamni tries to arrest Shiv Dutt but by then, the Paurava Army was under Shiv Dutt's controlled and he overthrowed Bamni. Malay is imprisoned alongside Bamni and Anusuya. When Anusuya is tortured and humiliated by Shiv Dutt, Malay tries in vain to defend her. He is rescued after Porus retakes the Paurava Kingdom. He is not shown afterwards.
 Vivek Vallah as The Rajguru: The royal priest of the Paurava Kingdom. He is loyal to his kingdom but is forced to support Darius in his plan to assassinate the Paurava royal family on pain of death. He briefly returns in the sequel, Chandragupta Maurya.
 Ajay Jayram as Chintan Kumar: A man who was the commentator during the annual competition between the Paurava Kingdom and Takshashila. Later he helps Porus bring the Paurava slaves he rescued to the Paurava Kingdom. However, he is soon caught and killed by Bamni.
 Sujeet Kumar as Bhairav: The main shishya (disciple) of Chanakya. He returns in the sequel Chandragupta Maurya.
 Karishma Rawat as Cleopatra: Daughter of Philip's adviser Attalus, seventh and last wife of Philip, mother of Europa and Caranus. Philip married her so her child could succeed him, as he did not want Alexander to succeed him and his other son, Arrihdaeus had become insane. After Philip's assassination, she along with her children is executed by Alexander. Not be confused with Alexander's sister Cleopatra. Based on Cleopatra Eurydice of Macedon.
 Suzanne Bernert as Ada: She was the satrap (governor) of Caria who was expelled by her own brother. She helped Alexander conquer Halicarnassus (a strong fortress in Caria) and as reward was made Queen of Caria by Alexander, and proclaimed by Alexander as his mother (so after her death, Caria would come under Alexander's control). She is not mentioned afterwards, so it can be presumed she died in 326 BCE as in real history. Based on Ada of Caria.
 Ruby Kakar as an Oracle: A Greek priestess and fortune teller, who was a disciple of the aforementioned Oracle. After Alexander kills her mentor, she goes to the Paurava Kingdom to inform his destined rival Porus about Alexander and begs Porus to avenge her mentor. She is not shown afterwards.
 Chidaksha Chand as Cleopatra: Daughter of Philip and Olympias, younger sister of Alexander the Great. Princess of Macedonia, later Queen of Epirus. She spent much of her life at Epirus, with her maternal uncle. When Philip decided to marry her to Olympias' brother and her uncle, Alexander of Epirus without her consent, she was heartbroken. Though not privy of Alexander and Olympias' plan to assassinate Philip, she was glad to see her brother on the throne. She is not show afterwards, so it can be presumed she was killed by Alexander's general Antigonus, as in real history. Not to be confused with Philip's wife Cleopatra. Based on Cleopatra of Macedon.
 Rizwan Kalshyan as Alexander of Epirus: Younger brother of Olympias, maternal uncle of Alexander and Cleopatra, and later husband of Cleopatra. King of Epirus. On Philip's instigation, he married his niece Cleopatra. He is not show afterwards so it can be presumed he was killed in the Battle of Pandosia in 331 BCE, as in real history.
 Browny Parashar as Oxyartes: Father of Roxane, Commander-in-Chief of Bactra. After Alexander kills Bessus (for betraying Darius), he appoints Oxyartes as King of Bactria as he had heard of his loyalty from Bessus. Alexander later marries his daughter, Roxane. He is not mentioned afterwards. Based on Oxyartes.
 Aaron W. Reed as a Persian warrior: He was an exceptionally tall and muscular man, who was called the strongest warrior of Persia by Darius. He was summoned to represent Persia in an arena competition by Darius (if Persia won the competition, they would make military outposts in the Paurava Kingdom). After all other Persian warriors are defeated, he faces Porus, gives him a very tough fight and insults India. This infuriates Porus, who soon kills him and thus wins the competition.
 Tony Huge as a Persian warrior: He was an exceptionally muscular man who was called one of the strongest warriors of Persia by Mazaeus. He was summoned to represent Persia in an arena competition. He is killed by Porus.

Reception
The show was hailed as 'visually captivating' by India Today.

Pinkvilla called it the television version of the film Baahubali.

Sequel
Porus, being a finite series went off-air on 13 November 2018. Even before the end of the series, production house Swastik Pictures decided to tell the story of Chandragupta Maurya through a new show on Sony TV which replaced Porus and aired on the same time slot. Many key characters of Porus like Chanakya, Dhananand, Seleucus Nicator, Amatya Rakshas reprised their roles in the new show with the same actors portraying them. The new show Chandragupt Maurya was in seamless continuity with the ending of Porus. It went on-air on 14 November 2018 and off-air on 30 August 2019 after completing its story. Sourabh Raj Jain, who portrayed the character of Dhana Nanda in Porus reprised the role, whereas Tarun Khanna reprised his role of Chanakya and Nimai Bali as Amatya Rakshas.

Awards

See also 
List of programs broadcast by Sony Entertainment Television

References

External links
  on Sony LIV
 
 Porus on SonyTV

2017 Indian television series debuts
Indian historical television series
Television series set in Ancient India
Sony Entertainment Television original programming
Cultural depictions of Alexander the Great
Television series set in ancient Greece
Swastik Productions television series